TGQ or tgq may refer to:

 TGQ, the station code for Tenganmada railway station, Chattisgargh, India
 TGQ, the IATA code for Tangará da Serra Airport, Brazil
 tgq, the ISO 639-3 code for Tring language, Sarawak, Malaysia